Kaye Donachie (born 1970 in Glasgow) is a contemporary British painter based in London. Her modest-sized, figurative paintings make use of figurative imagery relating to modernism, domesticity, longing, and utopian counter-cultural movements. Stacy Martin describes her most recent show as embodying a "fascination with heroines and literary inspiration [which] runs throughout all her projects along with her subtle nods to romanticism making for a collection that is more 'poetic than narrative' in effect."

Donachie shows at Peres Projects in Berlin and Maureen Paley in London.
Her work has been reviewed in Frieze  and Artforum.

References

1970 births
Living people
20th-century Scottish painters
21st-century Scottish painters
20th-century Scottish women artists
21st-century Scottish women artists
Artists from Glasgow
British contemporary painters
Feminist artists
Scottish contemporary artists